Gulmohar Grand is an Indian television mini-series, which premiered on 3 May 2015 on Star Plus. The show is produced by Sunshine Productions which aired on Sundays nights. Aashim Gulati, Aakanksha Singh and Gaurav Chopra were the leads of the series.

This is a mini series, set in backdrop of the hotel industry, wherein each episode will have a different story.

Cast

Main cast
 Aakanksha Singh as Staff Anahita "Annie" Mehta/Fernandez
 Aashim Gulati as Security Manager Neel Gujral
 Gaurav Chopra as MD Aniruddh Dutt

Recurring
 Madan Joshi as Owner Mr. K. K. Jaitley
 Harleen Sethi as Staff Tina
 Teeshay Shah as Manager Teeshay
 Rashi Mal as Staff Saloni
 Garima Goel as Secretary Rishita
 Nikhil Diwan as Head of Security Ronnie D'Souza

Special appearances
 Parikshit Sahni as Mr. Devdhar
 Karan Grover as Charlie: The Mysterious Scarf Killer
 Deven Bhojani as Mr. Gopal
 Pratyusha Banerjee as Parinda Pathak
 Shubhangi Atre Poorey as Mrs. Kadambari Karthik
 Divya Verma as Mrs. Sampada Deshpande
 Pooja Kanwal as Mrs. Mayuri Jaitley Fernandez
 Shalmalee Desai as Avanti Devdhar

Production
The series was planned for 26 episodes. However, due to low ratings, it ended with 17 episodes.

The series was filmed in Imperial Palace, a hotel in Mumbai, Maharashtra. On its premiere, a launch party was held at a restaurant in Andheri, Mumbai.

References

External links
 Gulmohar Grand on Hotstar

2015 Indian television series debuts
2015 Indian television series endings
Hindi-language television shows
Television shows set in Mumbai
StarPlus original programming